The General Motors Precept was a 2000 low emission vehicle concept car aimed at meeting the  fuel economy goal of the Partnership for a New Generation of Vehicles between the US Government and GM, Ford, and Chrysler.  GM was able to meet the  fuel economy goal with the Precept, creating versions using Lithium and NiMH batteries with diesel, fuel cell and other hybrid version of the car. 

GM ended the project in 2000, claiming no one would be interested in buying a high fuel economy vehicle.  The near-term PNGV program, introduced during the Clinton Administration, was terminated by the Bush administration and replaced with the distant goals of the FreedomCAR vehicle program.

The Precept was never designed for production, but some of the ideas may have found their way into GM's "dual-mode" hybrid system.  The Precept used two 35 kW electric motors, one on the front axle and one on the rear axle.  The rear axle was also hooked up to a diesel engine or other mechanical power source capable of driving the rear wheels directly or of generating power for the motor on the front wheels.  Slow speed driving could be attained using the front motor and battery to turn the front wheels.  When the rear wheels were powered, the diesel genset was on.

The GM "dual-mode" hybrid can be viewed as a combined version of the power train used on the Precept, but independent of what kind of engine is used.  If you include the front-wheel motor into the rear-axle, divorce it from the engine genset, you conceptually convert the Precept two-axle system into a "dual-mode" drivetrain using only one axle and capable of being incorporated into large vehicles.

See also
 Partnership for a New Generation of Vehicles

Precept